Tipton is an unincorporated community in Champaign County, Illinois, United States. Tipton is located along a railroad line south of St. Joseph.

References

Unincorporated communities in Champaign County, Illinois
Unincorporated communities in Illinois